JTM may refer to:

 Jordan Transverse Mercator, a grid system
 Jornal Tribuna de Macau, a Portuguese newspaper in Macau
 Marshall JTM45, a guitar amplifier
 Jasons Travel Media, a New Zealand website
 JTM (born 1986), an American rapper